Lindum Valley is an ice-filled valley that opens northward to Hatherton Glacier, lying  west-northwest of Derrick Peak in the Britannia Range, Antarctica. It was named in association with Britannia by a University of Waikato geological party, 1978–79, led by Michael Selby, "Lindum" being an old Roman placename for present-day Lincoln, England.

External links

 Lindum Valley on USGS website
 Lindum Valley on SCAR website
 Lindum Valley area satellite image

References 

Valleys of Oates Land